Lozove is a village in Beryslav Raion, Kherson Oblast, southern Ukraine, about  north-northeast from the centre of Kherson city, besides the Inhulets river. The border of Kherson Oblast with Mykolaiv Oblast runs along the river on the northwest side of the village.

History 

The village came under attack by Russian forces in July 2022, during the Russian invasion of Ukraine. The village was subsequently recaptured during the initial preparation stages of the 2022 Ukraine summer counteroffensive by the Ukrainian Armed Forces later in the same month.

References

Villages in Beryslav Raion